The 2019 Lucas Oil 150 is a NASCAR Gander Outdoors Truck Series race held on November 8, 2019, at ISM Raceway in Avondale, Arizona. Contested over 150 laps on the  oval, it was the 22nd race of the 2019 NASCAR Gander Outdoors Truck Series season, sixth race of the Playoffs, and final race of the Round of 6.

Background

Track

ISM Raceway is a 1-mile, low-banked tri-oval race track located in Avondale, Arizona, near Phoenix. The motorsport track opened in 1964 and currently hosts two NASCAR race weekends annually. ISM Raceway has also hosted the CART, IndyCar Series, USAC and the WeatherTech SportsCar Championship. The raceway is currently owned and operated by International Speedway Corporation.

Entry list

Practice

First practice

Final practice

Qualifying

Qualifying results

. – Playoffs driver

Race

Summary
Austin Hill started on pole. Stewart Friesen was penalized for beating Hill to the start/finish line on the initial start. A caution flew on lap 2 for Brandon Jones spinning in turn 2, sending Friesen to the rear of the field on the restart. On the restart, Ben Rhodes took the lead when Hill was unable to keep up speed.

The caution flag flew for John Hunter Nemechek swerving below Kraus as they entered turn 3, hitting Kraus and sending him into the wall. Rhodes battled Chandler Smith on the restart, ultimately completing a pass and winning Stage 1.

Chastain struggled in Stage 2 as only his left-side tires were changed. Stage 2 was won by Jones, while Brett Moffitt secured a spot in the championship 4 due to having a significant points lead. This left Chastain, Friesen, Hill, and Matt Crafton battling for the remaining spots.

The final stage only saw one caution, occurring when Sam Mayer overdrove in a turn and collected Nemechek. On the restart, Friesen slipped his way through the pack and caught up to Jones, overtaking him with 4 laps remaining. Jones attempted to take the lead, but Friesen successfully blocked him on the corners and held him off to win the race and a spot in the championship 4. Chastain and Crafton (with a 13 point and 6 point respective lead over the cutoff) secured the last two spots over Hill, whose stage points weren't enough to overtake Crafton for a spot. Tyler Ankrum was also eliminated due to not winning any stage points and falling too far behind in the race.

Stage Results

Stage One
Laps: 40

Stage Two
Laps: 40

Final Stage Results

Stage Three
Laps: 70

. – Driver advanced to the Championship 4.

. – Driver was eliminated from the playoffs.

References

2019 in sports in Arizona
Lucas Oil 150
NASCAR races at Phoenix Raceway